Helmut Peter Müller-Brühl (28 June 1933 – 2 January 2012) was a German conductor.

Müller-Brühl was a pupil of Hermann Abendroth, founder of the Cologne Chamber Orchestra. In 1958, Müller-Brühl invited this orchestra to be the principal orchestra for concerts given at his family home, Schloss Brühl. In 1964, the orchestra's conductor, Erich Kraak, invited Müller-Brühl to be chief conductor, and Müller-Brühl led the orchestra until 2008.  He also successfully collaborated with Takako Nishizaki on the “Discovery” album of violin concertos by the Chevalier de Saint-Georges. Müller-Brühl died on January 2, 2012, following a long illness.  He was 78.

References 

Helmut Müller-Brühl biography and discography at Naxos.com
Cologne Chamber Orchestra at Naxos.com

German male conductors (music)
1933 births
2012 deaths
20th-century German conductors (music)
20th-century German male musicians